The Voice of Finland (season 2) is the second season of the Finnish reality singing competition based on The Voice format. The season premiered on Nelonen on January 4, 2013.

The coaches are legendary singer Paula Koivuniemi, glam rock singer Michael Monroe, former Lauri Tähkä & Elonkerjuu frontman Lauri Tähkä, and rapper Elastinen. Axl Smith hosts the program.

The winner of the second season was Antti Railio, mentored by Paula Koivuniemi. The runner-up was Emilia Ekström.

Overview
The series consists of three phases: a blind audition, a battle phase, and live performance shows. Four judges/coaches, all noteworthy recording artists, choose teams of contestants through a blind audition process where the coaches cannot see, but only hear the auditioner. Each judge has the length of the auditioner's performance (about one minute) to decide if he or she wants that singer on his or her team; if two or more judges want the same singer (as happens frequently), the singer has the final choice of coach.

Each team of contestants is mentored and developed by its respective coach. In the second stage, called the battle phase, coaches have two of their team members battle against each other directly by singing the same song together, with the coach choosing which team member to advance from each of four individual "battles" into the first live round.

In the final phase, the remaining contestants (Final 24) compete against each other in live broadcasts. Within the first live round, the surviving six acts from each team again compete head-to-head, with public votes determining one of two acts from each team that will advance to the final eight, while the coach chooses which of the remaining acts comprises the other performer remaining on the team. The television audience and the coaches have equal say 50/50 in deciding who moves on to the semi-final. In the semi-final the results are based on a mix of public vote, Spotify listening and Ruutu.fi viewing of the previous week's performances, and voting of coaches. Each carries equal weight of 100 points for a total of 300 points. With one team member remaining for each coach, the (final 4) contestants compete against each other in the finale with the outcome decided by Spotify/Ruutu.fi vote and public vote, both with equal weight of 100 points for a total of 200 points.

All finalists will release a single and the winner will receive a record deal with Universal. In addition, the winner gets an Opel Mokka at his/her disposal for one year.

Episodes

The Blind Auditions

Episode 1: January 4, 2013

Episode 2: January 11, 2013

Episode 3: January 18, 2013

Episode 4: January 25, 2013

Episode 5: February 1, 2013

Episode 6: February 8, 2013

The Wildcards

Episodes 7–10: Battle Rounds (4 weeks) 
After the Blind Auditions, each coach had 12 contestants, except for Tähkä who had one extra. The Battle Rounds aired between February 15 and March 8.

 – Battle winner

The trusted advisors for these episodes are: producer Jukka Immonen working with Elastinen; musician and composer Milla Viljamaa working with Lauri Tähkä; producer Mika Toivanen with Paula Koivuniemi; and producer Riku Mattila working with Michael Monroe.

 – Eliminated in the battle rounds

The Live Rounds

Episode 1: March 15, 2013

Episode 2: March 22, 2013

Episode 3: March 29, 2013

Episode 4: April 5, 2013

Episode 5: April 12, 2013

Semifinal: April 19, 2013 
Competition performances

Semi-Final results

Final: April 26, 2013 
Competition performances
Each finalist performed an original song and a duet with their team coach.

Final results

 – Winner
 – Runner-up
 – 3rd/4th place

The Best of the Voice of Finland: May 4, 2013 
All finalists and semifinalists performing live on a cruise day after the final.

Summaries

Results table
Color Key
 – Team Elastinen
 – Team Lauri
 – Team Paula
 – Team Michael

Reception and TV ratings
Season two premiered on January 4, 2013 and was watched by 746,000 viewers. It was down 8.9 percent from first season's premiere December 30, 2011 which was the most viewed program on Nelonen in the year 2011. The Voice of Finland airs twice a week, first Friday evening at 8:00 pm and re-run on Sunday afternoon at 5:00 pm.

Notes
Rating is the average number of viewers during the program.
The latest weekly ratings contain timeshift viewing only during the same day. Older weekly ratings contain timeshift viewing during seven days.

See also
The Voice (TV series)
:fi:The Voice of Finland

References

External links
The Voice of Finland Official website

2
2013 Finnish television seasons
2011 Finnish television series debuts
2010s Finnish television series